Shane Warren Kippel (born June 4, 1986) is a Canadian actor. He is best known for his role as Gavin "Spinner" Mason on Degrassi: The Next Generation. In 2010, after nine years on Degrassi, Kippel was written out of the program and did not return for season 10, but returned for an appearance in a season 14 episode. He again reprised his role for two episodes of Degrassi: Next Class, along with several of his previous cast mates.

Career
Kippel played Chad the Jock in the 2003 film Todd and the Book of Pure Evil, which was tagged as "A teenager's guide to heavy metal, cheerleaders, true love, and Satan". He also had a recurring role on Life with Derek as the I-Wanna-Rock drummer Ralph in the band "D-Rock".

In 2010, he made an appearance on Pure Pwnage and played Davis in the film Dog Pound. Kippel also played Gavin "Spinner" Mason on Degrassi: The Next Generation from seasons 1-9 and reprised his role in the television film Degrassi Takes Manhattan. Kippel also recently reprised his role in an episode of season 14, and again reprised his role for two episodes of Degrassi: Next Class, along with several of his previous cast mates.

In 2018, Kippel was in Drake's music video for "I'm Upset", which took place during a Degrassi reunion, reprising his role as Spinner.

Kippel played drums on the rock band Open Your Eyes' debut album Truth or Consequence. Kippel currently is a drummer for the alternative/rock group Dear Love.

Personal life 
Kippel is Jewish and has three brothers.

References

External links
 

1986 births
21st-century Canadian male actors
Canadian male television actors
Jewish Canadian male actors
Living people
Male actors from Toronto